San Giorgio a Liri is a comune (municipality) in the Province of Frosinone in the Italian region Lazio, located about  southeast of Rome and about  southeast of Frosinone.

Geography 
The little town is located in the southernmost part of the province of Frosinone, between the Aurunci mountains and the Liri river. San Giorgio a Liri borders the following municipalities: Castelnuovo Parano, Esperia, Pignataro Interamna, Sant'Apollinare, Vallemaio.

References

External links
 Official website

Cities and towns in Lazio